John Barry Foster (21 August 1927 – 11 February 2002) was an English actor who had an extensive career in film, radio, stage and television over almost 50 years. He was best known for portraying the title character in the British crime series Van der Valk (1972–1992) and Bob Rusk in Alfred Hitchcock's Frenzy (1972).

Early life
Foster was born on 21 August 1927 in Beeston, Nottinghamshire, the son of a toolsetter. His family moved to Hayes, Middlesex when he was a few months old. He received his formal education at Southall County School.

After leaving school, Foster trained as a plastics organic chemist at the local EMI Central Research Laboratories, while unsuccessfully submitting ideas to advertising agencies. Having been "called to the Colours" under the National Service Act 1948, Foster served with the Royal Air Force.

He subsequently trained as an actor, having won a scholarship to train at the Central School of Speech and Drama in London. He arrived there aged 20 and soon acquired the affectionate nickname "Fozza", which stayed with him for the rest of his life. It was at the Central School that he became friends with actor and playwright Harold Pinter. Foster appeared on stage in three of Pinter's plays: The Basement, The Tea Party and A Slight Ache, in 1987.

Career
Foster's professional stage debut came in 1952 as Lorenzo in The Merchant of Venice in County Cork. In 1955, he made his London stage debut as the Electrician in The Night of the Ball at the New Theatre (now the Noël Coward Theatre). His first film role was in The Battle of the River Plate (1956), as part of the crew of HMS Exeter, in which he played Able Seaman Roper. Over the next decade and a half, he performed in Joseph Losey's King and Country (1964), The Family Way (1966), Robbery (1967), Inspector Clouseau (1968) and Battle of Britain (1969). He had a regular role on the TV series The Troubleshooters (1965). In 1970, he played a Fenian revolutionary paramilitary leader in David Lean's epic film Ryan's Daughter.

In 1972 Foster played two roles, on opposite sides of the law. The first was the cynical Dutch detective Van der Valk, a role he played, on and off, until 1992. The second was a serial murderer in Alfred Hitchcock's film Frenzy. Frenzy was Hitchcock's next-to-last film, made towards the end of an acclaimed and commercially highly successful career, and caused controversy for the scene in which Foster was required to simulate a rape and a murder, reportedly driven by Hitchcock's desire to prove that he was still relevant as a director in a more permissive age. Michael Caine had previously rejected the role and criticised the nature of the film.

Shortly after the third series of Van der Valk, Foster took on the role of Sherlock Holmes in a series of radio plays in 1978. He recorded 13 episodes of the Holmes canon, with David Buck as Dr Watson. Foster was seen on BBC television in Fall of Eagles (1974, in the role of Kaiser Wilhelm II and as the condescending chief of British Intelligence in the adaptation of the John le Carré novel Smiley's People (1982). During this time, Foster appeared in the films Sweeney! (1977), spun off from the TV series; The Wild Geese (1978); Merchant Ivory's Heat and Dust (1983); The Whistle Blower (1986); and Maurice (1987).

From the 1990s, Foster mainly performed on stage. He took on the role of Inspector Goole in J.B. Priestley's An Inspector Calls in a production directed by Stephen Daldry. In 2000, he starred as Prospero in The Tempest, directed by Julia Stafford Northcote at Stafford Castle. From 2001 to 2002, he performed in a run of Yasmina Reza's stage play 'Art' in the West End of London.

Personal life
Foster married Judith Shergold in 1955 in Birkenhead, the marriage producing two daughters and a son. After Foster's death, a trust was set up, titled the Barry Foster Memorial Award, to help disabled children become involved in the theatre. Foster was a talented amateur pianist, with a penchant for jazz music.

Death
Foster became ill while appearing in a play in the West End on 8 February 2002 and was taken to hospital. He died of a heart attack aged 74 on 11 February 2002 at the Royal Surrey County Hospital in Guildford, Surrey, not far from where he lived.

A funeral service was held for him on 21 February 2002 at St Stephen's Church at the village of Shottermill, near Haslemere. His body was cremated at Guildford Crematorium, and his ashes divided, part being interred at St Stephen's and the remainder being interred in France.

Filmography

 The Baby and the Battleship (1956) – First Sailor at Dance (uncredited)
 The Battle of the River Plate (1956) – Bill Roper, Capt. Bell's messenger, HMS Exeter (uncredited)
 Yangtse Incident: The Story of H.M.S. Amethyst (1957) – PO McCarthy RN
 High Flight (1957) – Wilcox
 Dunkirk (1958) – Don R
 Sea Fury (1958) – Vincent
 Sea of Sand (1958) – Corporal Mathieson
 Yesterday's Enemy (1958 BBC teleplay) – 2nd Lt Hastings
 Four Desperate Men (1959) (aka Siege of Pinchgut) - Charlie Patterson (uncredited)
 Surprise Package (1960) – US Marshal
 Playback (1962) (Edgar Wallace Mysteries) – Constable Dave Hollis
 King & Country (1964) – Lieutenant Webb
 The Family Way (1966) – Joe Thompson
 Robbery (1967) – Frank
 Inspector Clouseau (1968) – Addison Steele
 Twisted Nerve (1968) – Gerry Henderson
 The Guru (1969) – Chris
 Battle of Britain (1969) – Squadron Leader Edwards
 Ryan's Daughter (1970) – Tim O'Leary
 A Taste of Honey 1970) (20th. Sept-4th. Oct.) - Peter (3-part, BBCTV mini series, with Diana Dors, made for schools)
 Van der Valk (1972) – Simon 'Piet' Van der Valk
 Frenzy (1972) – Robert Rusk
 Divorce His, Divorce Hers (1973) – Donald Trenton
 A Quiet Day in Belfast (1974) – John Slattery
 Fall of Eagles (1974) – Kaiser William II
 The Last Word (1975) – Edward
 Orde Wingate (1976) – Orde Wingate
 Sweeney! (1977) – Elliott McQueen
 The Three Hostages (1977) – Richard Hannay
 The Wild Geese (1978) – Thomas Balfour
 Danger on Dartmoor (1980) – Green
 Smiley's People (1982) – Saul Enderby
 A Woman Called Golda (1982) – Orde Wingate
 Heat and Dust (1983) – Major Minnies, the Political Agent
 Death of an Expert Witness (1983) – Dr. Maxim Howarth, Director of Hoggatt's Laboratory
 To Catch a King (1984) – Max Winter
 Bergerac, episode The Last Interview (1985) - Barry Foster
 The Whistle Blower (1986) – Charles Greig
 Succubus (1987, TV Movie) (horror film with Lynsey Baxter, Pamela Salem, Jeremy Gilley) – Mike
 Three Kinds of Heat (1987) – Norris
 Maurice (1987) – Dean Cornwallis
 Beyond the Next Mountain (1987) – Alan Montforce
 The Killing Game (1988) – Jack
 The Free Frenchman (1989) – Maj. Trent
 Inspector Morse, episode The Last Enemy (1989) – Sir Alexander Reece
 King of the Wind (1990) – Mr. Williams
 Roger Roger (1999) – Pieter Eugene 
 Rancid Aluminium (2000) – Doctor (final film role)

Radio
 The George Cragge series – DCI Frank Jefferson
 Space Force (1984–85) – Saxon Berry
 A fall of Moondust (1981) – Chief Engineer Jim Lawrence
 Sherlock Holmes (1978) – Sherlock Holmes, with David Buck as Dr. Watson
 The Quarry (1965) BBC Radio Drama as Douglas Shemley

Sources
 BFI Film & TV Database

References

External links
 
 Obituary in the Independent 2002
 Obituary in the Telegraph 2002
 Obituary at the BBC 2002

1927 births
2002 deaths
20th-century English male actors
Alumni of the Royal Central School of Speech and Drama
English male film actors
English male radio actors
English male stage actors
English male television actors
People from Beeston, Nottinghamshire
People from Hayes, Hillingdon